{{DISPLAYTITLE:Xi2 Capricorni}}

Xi2 Capricorni (ξ2 Capricorni) is a yellow-white hued star in the southern constellation of Capricornus. It is dimly visible to the naked eye on a dark night, having an apparent visual magnitude of +5.83. Based upon an annual parallax shift of 36.10 mas as seen from Earth, this system is located 90 light years from the Sun.

It is around three billion years old with 1.2 times the mass of the Sun. Although considered a single star, there is reason to suspect it forms a wide physical pair with the visual magnitude 10.94 red dwarf star LP 754–50. If they are gravitationally bound, their orbital period would be around 3.7 million years.

References

F-type main-sequence stars
Capricorni, Xi2
Capricornus (constellation)
Durchmusterung objects
Capricorni, 02
191862
099572
7715
4139